National Research University of Electronic Technology (lit. National Research University "Moscow Institute of Electronic Technology") is a Russian technical university in the field of microelectronics, information and computer technologies and one of 29 National Research Universities. University was founded in 1965 and is based in Zelenograd, Moscow (the Soviet Union's center for electronic and microelectronic design and engineering).

Architecture 
The University complex was designed by the architects Felix Novikov and Grigory Saevich and built in 1967-1971. The complex has some similarity with the complex of the Finnish Helsinki University of Technology, built in 1954-1969 by architect Alvar Aalto. The main administrative building (#1) with library and five large lecture halls, the assembly hall (#2) with dining hall, two academic buildings (#3 and #4), and sports complex (#5) of multipurpose arena and swimming pool were built of red bricks and connected by passages in united microtown.

The decoration of the exterior walls of the library is the huge white bas-relief (970 m², all four walls) "The Becoming of a Homo sapiens" (Stanovlenie cheloveka razumnogo) completed in 1974 by the sculptor Ernst Neizvestny.

The main facades of the main administrative building and the assembly hall are turned to Shokin's Square, named after Alexander Shokin (1909-1988), the twice Hero of Socialist Labour, the USSR Minister of Electronic Industry, one of founders of Zelenograd and MIET. The main MIET entrance is decorated by clock designed by the artist Sergey Chekhov and the sculptor Valery Tyulin and placed in the white tower. The sound system of the clock mimics striking clock (one bell stroke every 15 minutes, and X strokes of the bell at X o'clock sharp).

There is Shokin's bust in the park near the square. There are also Skokin's and Presnukhin's (the first rector) memorial plates respectively on the right and left sides of the main administrative building facade (if we are looking on the facade).

Institutes and educational programs
 Institute of Biomedical Systems
 Biotechnical systems and technologies
 Institute of High-Tech Law, Social Science and Humanities
 Legal support for national security
 Institute of Linguistic and Pedagogical Education Linguistic
 Institute of International Education Institute of Microdevices and Control Systems Computer science and engineering
 Radio engineering
 Control of technical systems
 Institute of Nano- and Microsystem Engineering Design and technology of electronic facilities
 Institute of Advanced Materials and Technologies Nanomaterials
 Material science and technologies
 Technosphere safety
 Institute of system and software engineering and information technologies Applied computer science
 Software engineering
 Quality control
 Institute of Physics and Applied Mathematics Military Educational Center military specialties for Air Defence of the Russian Ground Forces

 Educational programs outside institutes' Design
 Infocommunication technologies and systems
 Information systems and technologies
 Information security
 Management
 Applied mathematics
 Electronics and nanoelectronics

 Rectors 
 Leonid Viktorovich Ershov – 1966 (acting)
 Leonid Nikolaevich Presnukhin – 1966–88
 Vitali Dmitrievich Verner – 1988–98
 Yuri Aleksandrovich Chaplygin – 1998–2016
 Vladimir Aleksandrovich Bespalov – 2016–...

Notes
The university can be also referred to as Moscow Institute of Electronic Engineering'' in the English language sources, which was its English official name in the 1990s.

See also
Moscow Institute of Electronics and Mathematics, another Russian technical institute founded in 1960s within the scope of the Soviet microelectronics program

References

External links 

 English and Russian official website

Zelenograd
Universities in Moscow
Educational institutions established in 1965
Universities and institutes established in the Soviet Union
National research universities in Russia
1965 establishments in the Soviet Union
Technical universities and colleges in Russia
Cultural heritage monuments of regional significance in Moscow